Las tres tumbas (English: "The Three Tombs") is a 1980 Mexican drama film directed by Alberto Mariscal and starring Federico Villa, Norma Lazareno and Narciso Busquets.

Plot
Two lovers marry despite all objections, shocking the people of their town. After many years, her three children return to the town, and upon arrival they find out that the people there have not yet forgiven their parents and therefore they are not welcome.

Cast
Federico Villa as Pedro
Norma Lazareno as Fabiana
Narciso Busquets as Don Luis
Freddy Fernández as Febronio
Lorenzo de Monteclaro as Pedro

References

Bibliography
Garza Arredondo, Julián. El viejo Paulino: poética popular de Julián Garza. Fondo Editorial de NL, 2006.
Díaz López, Marina. Historia de la producción cinematográfica mexicana, 1977-1978, Volumen 1. Universidad de Guadalajara, 2005.
Amador, María Luisa; Ayala Blanco, Jorge. Cartelera cinematográfica, 1980-1989. UNAM, 2006.

External links

1980 drama films
1980 films
Mexican drama films
1980s Spanish-language films
1980s Mexican films